Piazza Aurelio Saffi is located at the heart of Forlì, Italy and offers some of the most interesting town sights.

In the middle of the square there stands the statue of Aurelio Saffi which is surrounded by some of the most distinguished and ancient buildings of the town. On the southern side of the square there stands the Abbey of San Mercuriale. Next to the Abbey there is the Palazzo Paulucci de Calboli, built at the beginning of the 18th century.

The eastern side of the square is taken up by the Palazzo delle Poste (Post Building), built in the early 1930s.

The palazzo comunale takes up the northern side of the square. It dates back to the year 1000 and it is now the seat of the Town Hall.

On the west side, at the corner with Corso Diaz, there stands the Palazzo del Podestà, built in gothic style in 1460. On its right side there is Palazzo Albertini, an elegant 15th-century building in Venetian style.

External links

 The video of an environmentalist demonstration at Piazza Saffi in Forlì by Forlì.tv

Piazzas in Forlì
Buildings and structures in Forlì
Tourist attractions in Emilia-Romagna